Ben Cramer, better known as Old Sea Brigade, is an American songwriter and producer, signed to Nettwerk Music Group. Originally from Atlanta, Georgia, Cramer currently resides in Nashville, Tennessee.

Career
Old Sea Brigade's debut self-titled EP was released in January 2016 to much critical acclaim. Cramer spent the following year touring the United States and Europe, including support shows with Joseph, Julien Baker, and Benjamin Francis Leftwich. His music has been described as indie folk with "a sense of Southern-gothic". Old Sea Brigade released his debut album Ode to a Friend in January 2019. In August 2020, Old Sea Brigade released a collaborative EP, All The Ways You Sing In The Dark, with his friend, Luke Sital-Singh. Old Sea Brigade's music has been featured in notable TV shows including Grey's Anatomy, This Is Us, Nashville (2012 TV series), and A Million Little Things.

Discography

References

External links
 Official website

American folk-pop singers
American male singer-songwriters
American folk singers
Singer-songwriters from Tennessee
1991 births
Living people
21st-century American singers
21st-century American male singers
Singer-songwriters from Georgia (U.S. state)